This is a list of people who have served as Lord Lieutenant of Berkshire. Since 1689, all Lords Lieutenant have also been Custos Rotulorum of Berkshire.

Lord-Lieutenants of Berkshire
Charles Brandon, 1st Duke of Suffolk 1545–22 August 1545
Edward Seymour, 1st Duke of Somerset 10 May 1551 – 22 January 1552
William Parr, 1st Marquess of Northampton 1552–?
Sir William FitzWilliam 1559
Henry Norris, 1st Baron Norreys 17 September 1586 – 27 June 1601 jointly with
Sir Francis Knollys 12 September 1586 – 19 July 1596 and
William Knollys, 1st Earl of Banbury 4 November 1596 – 25 May 1632 jointly with
Henry Rich, 1st Earl of Holland 28 March 1628 – 23 August 1643 (Parliamentary from 1642)
Interregnum
John Lovelace, 2nd Baron Lovelace 28 August 1660 – 25 November 1670
Prince Rupert of the Rhine 7 November 1670 – 29 November 1682
Henry Howard, 7th Duke of Norfolk 16 December 1682 – 2 April 1701
Montagu Venables-Bertie, 2nd Earl of Abingdon 12 May 1701 – 11 June 1702
William Craven, 2nd Baron Craven 11 June 1702 – 9 October 1711
George FitzRoy, 1st Duke of Northumberland 15 May 1712 – 12 November 1714
Charles Beauclerk, 1st Duke of St Albans 12 November 1714 – 10 May 1726
Charles Beauclerk, 2nd Duke of St Albans 4 March 1727 – 27 July 1751
George Beauclerk, 3rd Duke of St Albans 30 October 1751 – 18 March 1761
Vere Beauclerk, 1st Baron Vere 18 March 1761 – 16 July 1771
George Beauclerk, 3rd Duke of St Albans 16 July 1771 – 1 February 1786
William Craven, 6th Baron Craven 1786–26 September 1791
Jacob Pleydell-Bouverie, 2nd Earl of Radnor 1791–9 December 1819
William Craven, 1st Earl of Craven 9 December 1819 – 30 July 1825
Montagu Bertie, 5th Earl of Abingdon 27 April 1826 – 16 October 1854
Montagu Bertie, 6th Earl of Abingdon 13 February 1854 – 7 September 1881
George Craven, 3rd Earl of Craven 7 September 1881 – 7 December 1883
Ernest Brudenell-Bruce, 3rd Marquess of Ailesbury 16 January 1884 – 18 October 1886
Robert Loyd-Lindsay, 1st Baron Wantage 12 November 1886 – 10 June 1901 (deceased)
James Herbert Benyon 26 August 1901 – 14 February 1935
Arthur Loyd 22 March 1935 – 8 November 1944
Sir Henry Benyon, 1st Baronet 28 March 1945 – 15 June 1959
Hon. David John Smith 30 September 1959 – 1976
John Smith 5 March 1976 – 16 March 1978
Hon. Gordon William Nottage Palmer 16 March 1978 – 1989
John Ronald (Johnny) Henderson 4 September 1989 – 9 May 1995
Sir Philip Wroughton 9 May 1995 – 19 April 2008
Mary Bayliss 19 April 2008 – 14 January 2015
James Puxley 15 January 2015–To date

Vice Lord Lieutenants
The Lord-Lieutenant appoints one Vice Lord-Lieutenant for the county. This appointment ceases when the Lord-Lieutenant retires.

 Captain The Honourable Edward Nicholas Canning Beaumont MVO from Ascot, Appointed 9 November 1989
 Sir William Benyon of Englefield, 1994–2005
 Lady Elizabeth Godsal, Retired 04 Jan 2011
 James Puxley of Welford Park, Appointed 04 Jan 2011–2015
 Anthony West of Remenham DL, Appointed 2015
 Jeffrey Branch DL of Maidenhead, Appointed 2016, retired 4 August 2020
 Graham Eric Barker DL of Bray, Appointed 5 August 2020.

Current Deputy Lieutenants

Deputy Lieutenants traditionally support the Lord-Lieutenant. There are several deputy lieutenants at any time, depending on the population of the county. Their appointment does not terminate with the changing of the Lord-Lieutenant, but they usually retire at age 75. Berkshire currently (February 2023) has 35 Deputy Lieutenants in addition to the Lord-Lieutenant and Vice Lord-Lieutenant.
 Dr Christina Hill-Williams DL MA FRGS FRSA, appointed 27 July 2005
 Professor Susanna Rose JP DL, appointed 4 December 2007
 Paul Dick OBE JP DL, appointed 8 March 2010 
 Harry Merton Henderson DL, appointed 8 March 2010
 Hugo Vickers DL, appointed 8 March 2010
 Mrs Sarah Patricia Scrope DL, appointed 22 June 2011
 HH Judge Zoë Philippa Smith DL, appointed 22 June 2011
 Simon Peter Carter DL, appointed 9 March 2012
 General Sir Charles Redmond Watt KCB KCVO CBE DL, appointed 9 March 2012
 Charles David Brims DL, appointed 29 May 2013 
 Khan Mohammad Juna DL, appointed 29 May 2013 
 Brigadier Stephen Charles Matthews DL FRSA, appointed 29 May 2013 
 Mr Willie Hartley Russell MVO DL, appointed 1 Sep 2016  High Sheriff 2021-22.
 Mr Kiren Sharma MBE DL, appointed 1 Sep 2016 
 Mrs Felicity Rutland DL MA, appointed 1 Sep 2016.
 Mr Christoper Barrett DL, appointed 12 Jan 2018 
 Mr Richard Bennett DL BA (ECON) FCMA CGMA, appointed 12 Jan 2018 
 Lord Brownlow CVO DL, appointed 12 Jan 2018  
 Dr Peter Durrant MBE DL FSA, appointed 12 Jan 2018  
 Mr Sean Zain Taylor DL, appointed 12 Jan 2018 
 Mr Richard Charles Robert Anderson DL, appointed 17 Oct 2019
 Lt Col Sir Alexander Fergus Matheson of Matheson Bt.LVO DL, appointed 17 Oct 2019 
 Mrs Harriet Jane McCalmont DL, appointed 17 Oct 2019 
 Mr Andrew Aden Try DL, appointed 17 Oct 2019 
 Mrs Lindsey Beard JP DL, appointed 22 June 2021 
 Mrs Carol Jackson-Doerge DL, appointed 22 June 2021 
 Mrs Geraldine Lejeune OBE DL, appointed 22 June 2021 
 Mrs Lucy Zeal DL, appointed 22 June 2021 
 Dr Stefan Fafinski JP DL FBCS FRSA, appointed 17 February 2023
 Mr Tanweer Ikram CBE DL, appointed 17 February 2023
 Mr Chris Juden JP DL, appointed 17 February 2023
 Miss Susan Roberts DL, appointed 17 February 2023
 Mr Mark Sanderson DL, appointed 17 February 2023
 Mr Rohit Tanna DL, appointed 17 February 2023
 Mr Julian Walker TD DL, appointed 17 February 2023

Previous Deputy Lieutenants
A deputy lieutenant of Berkshire is commissioned by the Lord Lieutenant of Berkshire. Deputy lieutenants support the work of the lord-lieutenant. There can be several deputy lieutenants at any time, depending on the population of the county. Their appointment does not terminate with the changing of the lord-lieutenant, but they usually retire at age 75.

18th Century
20 August 1799: John Willes, Esq.
20 August 1799: James Croft, Esq.
20 August 1799: John Huddleston, Esq.
20 August 1799: Thomas William Ravenshaw, Esq.
Mr Chris Khoo DL, appointed 1 Sep 2016  Deceased 1 November 2022

References

 

Local government in Berkshire
 
Berkshire
Lord Lieutenant